Phyllanthera is a genus of flowering plants belonging to the family Apocynaceae.

Its native range is Melanesia to Northeastern Australia.

Species
Species:

Phyllanthera bifida 
Phyllanthera grayi 
Phyllanthera lancifolia 
Phyllanthera multinervosa 
Phyllanthera nymanii 
Phyllanthera papillata 
Phyllanthera perakensis 
Phyllanthera piforsteriana 
Phyllanthera sumatrana 
Phyllanthera takeuchiana

References

Apocynaceae
Apocynaceae genera